Hybomitra caucasica is a species of horse flies in the family Tabanidae.

Distribution and habitat
This species can be found in most of Europe (Austria, France, Germany, Italy, Spain, Switzerland, Poland and Romania) and in the Near East. These horse flies prefer mountainous regions.

Description
Hybomitra caucasica can reach a length of .The body is black and the wings are transparent. The compound eyes are well developed in both sexes.

Biology
Adults can be found from June to August. Males feed on nectar and plant juices, while females are bloodsuckers, feeding mainly on mammalian blood, as they require a blood meal before they are able to reproduce.

References

Tabanidae
Diptera of Europe
Insects described in 1925
Taxa named by Günther Enderlein